The Living Propeller (German: Der lebende Propeller) is a 1921 German silent drama film directed by Richard Eichberg and starring Lee Parry, Aruth Wartan and Felix Hecht.

The film's sets were designed by the art director Jacek Rotmil.

Cast
 Lee Parry as Gaby, Grossnichte von Lord Robert Lyonel 
 Aruth Wartan as Harry Lane, Artist 
 Felix Hecht as Graf Wladimir Kosewski 
 Max Wogritsch as Charles, Sohn von Lord Cecil 
 Syme Delmar as Ellinor Kosewski 
 Richard Georg as Bill Jackson, Artist 
 Willy Kaiser-Heyl as Lord Robert Lyonel 
 Josef Commer as Direktor des Tivoli Rosendaal, Amsterdam 
 Ly Corder as Lucy 
 Hardy von Francois as Lord Cecil, Herzog von Cunningham

References

Bibliography
 Grange, William. Cultural Chronicle of the Weimar Republic. Scarecrow Press, 2008.

External links

1921 films
Films of the Weimar Republic
Films directed by Richard Eichberg
German silent feature films